The 1978 United States Senate election in New Hampshire took place on November 7, 1978. Incumbent Democratic Senator Thomas J. McIntyre ran for re-election to a third term but was defeated by Republican  Gordon J. Humphrey.

Democratic primary

Candidates
 Raymond J. Coughlan, former U.S. Navy captain
Thomas J. McIntyre, incumbent Senator

Results

Republican primary

Candidates
Carmen Chimento, perennial candidate
Gordon J. Humphrey, professional pilot and conservative activist
Alf E. Jacobson, State Senator from New London
James Masiello, businessman and former Mayor of Keene

Results

General election

Results

See also 
 1978 United States Senate elections

References 

1978
New Hampshire
United States Senate